Pelecinobaccha costata, the cobalt hover fly, is a species of fly in the family Syrphidae. It is distributed from southern Ontario and the eastern United States.
The larvae are predators of scale insects.

References

Hoverflies 
Syrphini
Insects described in 1829
Diptera of North America